Glenea cyanipennis is a species of beetle in the family Cerambycidae. It was described by James Thomson in 1858.

Subspecies
 Glenea cyanipennis amboynica Thomson, 1860
 Glenea cyanipennis cyanipennis Thomson, 1858

References

cyanipennis
Beetles described in 1858